Thomas Walton was an English politician.

Thomas Walton may also refer to:

Thomas Walton (pirate), 16th-century British pirate
Tom Walton (golfer) (1891–1941), English golfer
Tom Walton (hurler) (1921–1998), Irish hurler

See also